The Solina String Ensemble, also marketed as the ARP String Ensemble, is a fully polyphonic multi-orchestral synthesizer with a 49-key keyboard, produced by Eminent BV (known for their Solina brand). It was distributed in the United States by ARP Instruments from 1974 to 1981. The sounds it incorporates are violin, viola, trumpet, horn, cello, and contrabass. The keyboard uses 'organ style' divide-down technology to make it polyphonic. The built-in chorus effect gives the instrument its distinctive sound.

Technology
The core technology is based on the string ensemble section of the Eminent 310 Unique electronic organ in 1972, manufactured by the Dutch company Eminent BV. The main oscillator consists of twelve discrete tone generators with octave divide-down to provide full polyphony (however all notes come from the same envelope and filter, so it is actually a paraphonic string machine); and the built-in triple chorus effect utilizes bucket-brigade devices (BBDs) controlled by two LFOs to create the characteristic vibrato.

Four versions have been released:
 SE-I: Mono Output with a permanent chorus effect 
 SE-II: Mono Output with an ON/OFF switch for the chorus effect
 SE-III: Stereo Outputs with a redesigned chorus effect
 SE-IV: Stereo Outputs with LEDs added on the front panel

Notable users
The Solina String Ensemble was extensively used by pop, rock, jazz and disco artists of the 1970s, including Richard Wright of Pink Floyd, on albums such as Wish You Were Here (most notably on "Shine On You Crazy Diamond") and Animals, Herbie Hancock, Bernie Worrell, Billy Beck (of Ohio Players), Kerry Livgren (of Kansas), Dennis DeYoung and Eumir Deodato. Parliament (band) used the Solina on several tracks, particularly as a solo instrument on songs such as "Chocolate City", “Give Up the Funk (Tear the Roof Off the Sucker)” and "Flash Light". Elton John used a String Ensemble on his hit song "Someone Saved My Life Tonight", the Rolling Stones in their hit "Fool to Cry", KC & the Sunshine Band in their hit, "Please Don't Go", the Buggles in "Video Killed the Radio Star", Hall & Oates in their cover version of "You've Lost That Lovin' Feeling", and Rick James in "Mary Jane". 

In 1975, George Harrison used the ARP on his song "You", and the same year the Bee Gees played it on their hit "Nights on Broadway". Stevie Wonder played the famous string line on Peter Frampton's 1977 ballad "I'm in You". The Solina string sound has also been used by Kim and Ricky Wilde, Brian Eno, Fun Lovin' Criminals, the Cure, Gorillaz, the Chameleons, Carpenters, Joy Division, Neil Young, Air, Anthony Cedric Vuagniaux and Rikk Agnew. Fleetwood Mac keyboardist Christine McVie used it on the band's Heroes Are Hard to Find album, most notably on her song "Come a Little Bit Closer." Brian Wilson of the Beach Boys used it on 15 Big Ones and The Beach Boys Love You, Charly Garcia on Pequeñas anécdotas sobre las instituciones, Porsuigieco, La Máquina de Hacer Pájaros, and with Serú Girán. Regional Mexican band Grupo Yndio had used a Solina in their Spanish-language cover of Leo Sayer's hit "When I Need You" ("Me Haces Falta").

Tony Visconti, who produced David Bowie’s "Heroes", solos the Solina string part in this fascinating song breakdown.

Recreations
Many companies have recreated virtual plugins and VSTs of the Solina String Ensemble. One of them is the Solina V, created by French-based company Arturia. It's a replica of the original Solina String Ensemble keyboard with added features like a new "Humana" voice preset and filters.

Gallery

See also
ARP String Synthesizer
ARP Instruments

References

Further reading

External links

 Retrosound - Pictures and Information about the Solina String Ensemble 
 Service Informations scanned as PDF-File

ARP synthesizers
String synthesizers
Polyphonic synthesizers
Analog synthesizers